The Florida Film Critics Circle Award for Best Supporting Actress is an award given by the Florida Film Critics Circle. It is given in honor of an actress who has delivered an outstanding performance in a supporting role.

Winners
 † = Winner of the Academy Award for Best Supporting Actress

1990s

2000s

2010s

2020s

Multiple winners

2 wins
 Cate Blanchett (2001, 2006)

Florida Film Critics Circle Awards
Film awards for supporting actress